Life on a Stick (originally titled Related by Family) is an American sitcom that aired on Fox from March 24 to April 27, 2005.  Thirteen episodes of the show were completed, but Fox only showed the first five before pulling the show due to poor ratings.

Premise
The show centers on several teen characters who work and hang out at the mall food court. The main characters are Laz,  his stepsister Molly, Laz's best friend Fred, and Laz's new girlfriend Lily. Laz's dad Rick and Molly's mom Michelle also play a large role in the show. They love all of their children, but their clear favorite is Gus (Frankie Ryan Manriquez).

Laz and Fred, both 18, have been friends forever. Just out of high school and unsure what they want to do with their lives, they take jobs at a mall food court, at "Yippiee Hot Dogs" run by Mr. Hut (Maz Jobrani). Laz meets Lily, the girl of his dreams there. Optimistic but not ambitious, Laz cuts a deal with his dad Rick and stepmom Michelle which allows Laz to continue living rent-free at home. All he must do is keep an eye on his stepsister, Molly. Michelle and Rick hope that Laz will help socialize Molly and get her on the right track with Jasper.

Cast
 Zachary Knighton as Laz Lackerson
 Charlie Finn as Fred
 Rachelle Lefevre as Lily
 Saige Thompson as Molly Callahan
 Amy Yasbeck as Michelle Lackerson 
 Matthew Glave as Rick Lackerson

Episodes
An alternate version of the pilot exists, originally titled Related by Family, featuring a different actor, Kurt Doss, playing Gus Lackerson.

Development and production
Originally called Related by Family, the show was created by Victor Fresco, who had also created the short-lived sitcom Andy Richter Controls the Universe. However, like Andy Richter Controls the Universe, poor ratings doomed Life on a Stick to quick cancellation. It only aired five low-rated episodes, although the premiere had American Idol for a lead-in. Thirteen episodes were produced.

Yasbeck took this role as part of the healing process following the death of her husband John Ritter. A role on Life on a Stick was offered to the then-unknown Charlie Day; he turned it down to continue working on the pilot for what would become It's Always Sunny in Philadelphia.

References

External links

 

2005 American television series debuts
2005 American television series endings
2000s American sitcoms
Television shows set in Seattle
English-language television shows
Fox Broadcasting Company original programming
Television series by CBS Studios
Television series created by Victor Fresco